Forest Place Historic District is a national historic district located at Culver, Marshall County, Indiana.  The district encompasses 14 contributing buildings in a residential section of Culver.  It developed between about 1917 and 1922, and includes examples of Bungalow / American Craftsman style architecture.  The houses are small -story frame dwellings, with either front gabled, side gabled, or hipped roofs.

It was listed on the National Register of Historic Places in 2000.

References

Historic districts on the National Register of Historic Places in Indiana
Houses on the National Register of Historic Places in Indiana
Historic districts in Marshall County, Indiana
National Register of Historic Places in Marshall County, Indiana